The Sport Racer is an American homebuilt racing aircraft that was designed and produced by Sport Racer Inc of Valley Center, Kansas. When it was available the aircraft was supplied in the form of plans for amateur construction.

Design and development
The Sport Racer features a cantilever mid-wing, a two-seats-in-tandem enclosed cockpit under a bubble canopy, fixed conventional landing gear with wheel pants and a single engine in tractor configuration.

The aircraft fuselage is made from welded 4130 steel tubing. The standard engine used is a  Ford Motor Company V-6 automotive conversion powerplant.

The manufacturer estimated the construction time from the supplied plans as 1600 hours.

Specifications (Sport Racer)

See also
List of aerobatic aircraft

References

External links
 Photo of a Sport Racer

Sport Racer
1990s United States sport aircraft
Single-engined tractor aircraft
Mid-wing aircraft
Homebuilt aircraft